Aleksandr Valeryevich Strokov (born 31 January 1991) is a former Russian football defender.

Club career
He made his debut in the Russian Football National League for FC Mordovia Saransk on 23 October 2013 in a game against FC Dynamo Saint Petersburg.

References

External links
 Career summary by sportbox.ru
 

1991 births
Living people
Russian footballers
Association football defenders
FC Mordovia Saransk players
FC Tambov players